This is a list of subjects in the State Heraldic Register of the Russian Federation (tr.: Gosudarstvenny geraldicheskiy registr Rossiyskoi Federatsii) as of January 1, 2005 (1000 entries at the time). The register systematizes the usage of official state symbols and is governed by the Heraldic Council of the President of the Russian Federation.

References

External links
Sovet.geraldika.ru Государственный геральдический регистр Российской Федерации (по состоянию на 1 января 2005 года)

Russian heraldry
Government agencies of Russia
Lists of flags of Russia